Holland–Dozier–Holland was a songwriting and production team consisting of Lamont Dozier and brothers Brian and Eddie Holland.  The trio wrote, arranged and produced many songs that helped define the Motown sound in the 1960s. During their tenure at Motown Records from 1962 to 1967, Dozier and Brian Holland were the composers and producers for each song, and Eddie Holland wrote the lyrics and arranged the vocals. Their most celebrated productions were singles for the Four Tops and the Supremes, including 10 of the Supremes' 12 US No. 1 singles, including "Baby Love", "Stop! In the Name of Love", and "You Keep Me Hangin' On".

From 1969 to 1972, due to a legal dispute with Motown, they did not write material under their own names, but instead used the collective pseudonym "Edythe Wayne". When the trio left Motown, they continued to work as a production team (with Eddie Holland being added to the producer credits), and as a songwriting team, until about 1974.

The trio was inducted into the Songwriters Hall of Fame in 1988 and the Rock and Roll Hall of Fame in 1990.

History
The trio came together at Motown in the early 1960s. Eddie Holland had been working with Motown founder Berry Gordy prior to that label being formed; his 1958 Mercury single "You" was one of Gordy's earliest productions. Later, Eddie Holland had a career as a Motown recording artist, scoring a US Top 30 hit in 1961 with "Jamie". Eddie's brother Brian Holland was a Motown staff songwriter who also tasted success in 1961, being a co-composer of the Marvelettes' US No. 1 "Please Mr. Postman".  Dozier had been a recording artist for several labels in the late 1950s and early 1960s, including the Anna label (owned by Berry Gordy's sister) and Motown subsidiary Mel-o-dy.

The three men eventually teamed up to create material for both themselves and other artists, but soon found they preferred being writers and producers to being performers (especially Eddie, who suffered from stage fright and retired from performing in 1964). They would write and produce scores of songs for Motown artists, including 25 Number 1 hit singles, such as "Heat Wave" for Martha and the Vandellas and "How Sweet It Is (To Be Loved by You)" for Marvin Gaye.

Lawsuits and solo careers
In 1967, H-D-H, as they were familiarly called, entered into a dispute with Berry Gordy Jr. over profit-sharing and royalties. Eddie Holland had the others stage a work slowdown and, by early 1968, the trio had left the label. They started their own labels, Invictus Records and Hot Wax Records, which were modestly successful. When Motown sued for breach of contract, H-D-H countersued. The subsequent litigation was one of the longest legal battles in music industry history. Because they were legally contracted to Motown's publishing arm, Jobete, they could not use their own names on songs they wrote, and their material was credited to Wayne-Dunbar. Edith Wayne was a friend of the Holland family, and Ron Dunbar was an associate who was a songwriter and producer.  The lawsuit was settled in 1977.

Dozier left Holland–Dozier–Holland Productions, Inc. (HDHP) in 1973 and resumed his career as a solo performing artist. In 1975, HDHP and Invictus Records sued Dozier and 31 others, claiming conspiracy to restrain trade and other charges. The suit was dismissed by a federal judge in 1982. From the mid-1970s onwards, HDHP, with Harold Beatty replacing Dozier, wrote and produced songs for a number of artists. HDHP even worked on material for Motown artists in the 1970s, including The Supremes and Michael Jackson, while its litigation against the company was still pending. Dozier commented in 2008, "The lawsuit was just our way of taking care of business that needed to be taken care of—just like Berry Gordy had to take care of his business which resulted in the lawsuit. Business is business, love is love."

Holland–Dozier–Holland threatened to sue the band Aerosmith in 1989 due to the resemblance of parts of the song "The Other Side" (from the album Pump) to the Holland–Dozier–Holland song "Standing in the Shadows of Love". To forestall litigation, Aerosmith agreed to add Holland–Dozier–Holland to the songwriting credits in the album's liner notes.

Later years
Dozier had his own production company and continued to work as a solo artist, producer and recording artist, while the Holland Brothers own HDH Records and Productions (without any participation from Lamont Dozier), which issues recordings from the Invictus and Hot Wax catalogs as well as new material.

For a "one-time only reunion", the three composed the score for the musical production of The First Wives Club, based on the novel by Olivia Goldsmith and a later hit film. The musical included 22 new songs from the songwriting trio, with a book by Rupert Holmes. The musical was produced by Paul Lambert and Jonas Neilson and premiered in July 2009 at The Old Globe Theater in San Diego. The San Diego production sold approximately 29,000 tickets in its five-week run. Ticket demand was so strong early on that The Old Globe extended its run (originally four weeks) prior to opening night.  However, reviews were mixed to negative, and the producers opted to rework the book.

In June 2014, it was announced that The First Wives Club (with an entirely new book written by Linda Bloodworth-Thomason) would be heading to Chicago premiering on February 16, 2015. The play now included a sprinkling of classic H-D-H songs (including "Stop! In The Name Of Love" and "My World Is Empty Without You"), interspersed with the new material.  Following the Chicago run, the production was to head to Broadway for a fall 2015 arrival, but the critical reception to the play was lukewarm to negative, and the production quietly closed after its Chicago run.

Legacy
Longtime BMI songwriters, Brian Holland affiliated with the performing rights organization in 1960, followed by Lamont Dozier in 1961 and Eddie Holland in 1963. They have won many BMI Awards, including BMI Pop Awards and Million-Air citations. On May 13, 2003, Holland–Dozier–Holland were honored as BMI Icons at the 51st BMI Pop Awards.

Holland–Dozier–Holland are mentioned (along with the Four Tops and their vocalist Levi Stubbs, as well as Norman Whitfield and Barrett Strong) in the lyrics of the song "Levi Stubbs' Tears" from the 1986 Billy Bragg album Talking with the Taxman about Poetry; and also in the lyrics of the Magnetic Fields' song "The Death of Ferdinand de Saussure", from their 1999 album 69 Love Songs.

Brian Holland, Lamont Dozier, and Eddie Holland were inducted into the Michigan Rock and Roll Legends Hall of Fame in 2010.

Discography

Songwriting

Production

Holland brothers without Dozier

Billboard Top Ten hit songs (US pop chart)

References

External links

 HDH Records Official Site
 Rock and Roll Hall of Fame inductee article
 SoulMusic Hall Of Fame at SoulMusic.com
 
 

Record producers from Michigan
American songwriting teams
Motown artists
African-American record producers
African-American songwriters
Record production trios
Ivor Novello Award winners